Combustion is a 2013 Spanish action film directed by Daniel Calparsoro which stars Álex González, Adriana Ugarte, and Alberto Ammann.

Cast

Production 
The screenplay was penned by Carlos Montero, Jaime Vaca and Calparsoro. The film is a Zeta Cinema and Antena 3 Films production. Shooting began on 22 September 2012. Shooting locations included Lisbon, and Madrid. Carlos Jean was responsible for the score.

Release 
Combustion premiered at the 16th Málaga Film Festival's main competition on 21 April 2013. Distributed by Sony Pictures, it was theatrically released in Spain on 26 April 2013.

See also 
 List of Spanish films of 2013

References

External links 

2013 action films
2013 films
2010s Spanish-language films
Films directed by Daniel Calparsoro
Spanish action films
Films shot in Lisbon
Films shot in Madrid
Atresmedia Cine films
Zeta Studios films
2010s Spanish films